William Hodgins may refer to:
 William H. Hodgins, American law enforcement officer
 William Thomas Hodgins, farmer and political figure in Ontario, Canada
 Bill Hodgins, Irish Gaelic footballer